Anne Goffin (born 23 January 1957 in Arlon) is a Belgian sport shooter. She competed in pistol shooting events at the Summer Olympics in 1976, 1988, and 1992.

Olympic results

References

1957 births
Living people
People from Arlon
Sportspeople from Luxembourg (Belgium)
ISSF pistol shooters
Belgian female sport shooters
Shooters at the 1976 Summer Olympics
Shooters at the 1988 Summer Olympics
Shooters at the 1992 Summer Olympics
Olympic shooters of Belgium
20th-century Belgian women